Iskandar Mirza Ismail (23 July 1956 – 1 November 2014) was a prominent Singaporean musician who worked as a composer, arranger, conductor, music director, recording producer, performer and educator in his long career. In recognition of his extensive contributions to the music scene of Singapore, he was awarded the Cultural Medallion in 2008.

Early years
Iskandar was the eldest of five children born to Singaporean musicians Ismail Kassim and Nona Asiah. His mother, a singer and protégé of Zubir Said, saw the musical talent in Iskandar and sent him to Zubir for weekly music lessons from the age of 8. Iskandar later studied the electone and eventually won first prize at the Singapore Electone Festival in 1975. At the age of 15, he became the youngest teacher at the Yamaha Music School in Singapore.

Encouraged by Zubir, Iskandar decided to study music at Berklee College of Music in 1976, where he won the John Lewis Jazz Masters Award for his excellence in jazz music in 1978. A year later, he graduated with a degree in Professional Music.

Career
One of Iskandar’s musical signatures was his prominent use of motivic development. Thematically, he often blended influences from Eastern and Western musical cultures, and composed music from numerous genres such as classical, pop, and folk music. Despite the fact that he did not speak Chinese, Iskandar wrote and produced songs for Chinese artistes when Warner Taiwan engaged his music studio for over 15 years. This led him to work with numerous Hong Kong artists including Sandy Lam, George Lam, Sally Yeh, Aaron Kwok, and Jacky Cheung.

Iskandar collaborated with other Asian artistic talents like Dick Lee, Anita Sarawak, and Ekachai Uekrongtham. He was the arranger for prominent local stage musicals such as Kampung Amber (1994), Sing to the Dawn (1996), Snow. Wolf. Lake (1997), and Chang & Eng (1997).

Achievements

Musical accomplishments
Since the 1980s, following his graduation from Berklee, Iskandar composed music for more than 10 opening and closing ceremonies of the Singapore Youth Festival. The year 1988 saw the first of his many musical directions of the National Day Parade. In addition to writing for the annual Chingay street parade held as part of the Lunar New Year celebrations, Iskandar also wrote music for the inaugural editions of the Asian Youth Games in 2009 and Youth Olympic Games in 2010, held in Singapore.

Iskandar’s music took him beyond the shores of Singapore on numerous occasions, often as part of Singapore's cultural diplomacy platform Spotlight. He also took charge of the musical production and direction for the 2006 Asian Games in Doha.

On top of his professional accomplishments, Iskandar was an advocate of nurturing future generations of Singaporean artists. He participated in the annual ChildAid charity concert by Singapore Press Holdings to raise funds for the Budding Artists Fund. After becoming the music director for the National University of Singapore Jazz Band in 2006, Iskandar strived to inspire young amateur jazz musicians and create performance opportunities to showcase their talent.

Awards

Selected works

Musicals

International works

Death
Iskandar passed away on 1 November 2014 after an extended battle with brain and lung cancer, leaving behind his wife Ernawaty Sorainto (married 1985) and two children, Emil Daruwin (born 1986) and Valerie (born 1987).

References

External links

Recipients of the Cultural Medallion
Singaporean composers
Singaporean musicians
Singaporean people of Malay descent
1956 births
2014 deaths